Jean-Christophe Beck (born November 30, 1972) is a Canadian television and film score composer and conductor. He is a brother of pianist Chilly Gonzales. He is best known for his collaborations with Disney and its subsidiaries, which include composing the soundtracks of The Muppets (2011) and Muppets Most Wanted (2014), Frozen (2013) and its 2019 sequel, the Marvel Cinematic Universe films Ant-Man (2015), Ant-Man and the Wasp (2018), and Ant-Man and the Wasp: Quantumania (2023) as well as its TV miniseries WandaVision (2021) and Hawkeye for Marvel Studios, and Free Guy (2021) for 20th Century Studios, as well as the company’s 100th anniversary logo. He also composed the music for the 2023 DC Extended Universe film Shazam! Fury of the Gods.

He is also noted for winning an Emmy Award in 1998 for his work on the television series Buffy the Vampire Slayer, as well as for composing the soundtrack of The Hangover (2009).

Early life 
Beck started piano lessons at five, and by eleven he was learning Bee Gees songs by ear and performing with his first band. Beck attended Crescent School where he studied piano, saxophone, and drums, and wrote many '80s love ballads.

While studying music at Yale, Beck wrote two musicals with his brother Jason, as well as an opera based on “The Tell-Tale Heart” by Edgar Allan Poe.

Career 
Upon graduation, Beck moved to Los Angeles to attend USC's film scoring program, where he studied with Jerry Goldsmith. A personal recommendation from Buddy Baker, then head of the USC Music Department, led to his first assignment for a Canadian TV series called White Fang. Several TV series later, he was asked to score the second season of WB Network's Buffy the Vampire Slayer. Beck received the Emmy Award for Outstanding Music Composition for his score to the Buffy episode, “Becoming, Part 1.”

In 2000, the cheerleading comedy Bring It On launched Beck's film career. His credits include Under the Tuscan Sun, Edge of Tomorrow, Crazy, Stupid, Love, Pitch Perfect, and the Hangover trilogy. More recently, Chris scored the Oscar- and Grammy-winning animated film Frozen, and several installments in the Marvel Cinematic Universe (MCU). At the D23 Expo in 2022, it was announced that Beck had composed a new arrangement of "When You Wish Upon a Star" to accompany the Walt Disney Studios's 100th anniversary production logo, which debuted ahead of the film Strange World.

Beck works out of his studio in Santa Monica, California.

Discography

Composer

Music department

Soundtrack

Filmography

Actor

Self

Accolades

See also
Music of the Marvel Cinematic Universe

References

External links

 
 
 Biography

1972 births
Animated film score composers
Annie Award winners
Blue Sky Studios people
Buffy the Vampire Slayer
Canadian conductors (music)
Canadian film score composers
Canadian music arrangers
Canadian musical theatre composers
Canadian television composers
Hollywood Records artists
Living people
Male conductors (music)
Male film score composers
Male musical theatre composers
Male television composers
Primetime Emmy Award winners
USC Thornton School of Music alumni
Varèse Sarabande Records artists
Yale University alumni